Chambers is an  American supernatural horror streaming television series created by Leah Rachel. The first season, consisting of ten episodes, premiered on Netflix on April 26, 2019. The series stars Uma Thurman, Tony Goldwyn, Sivan Alyra Rose, and Marcus LaVoi. In June 2019, the series was cancelled after one season.

Synopsis
Chambers follows the story of a teenager who, after receiving a heart transplant, is haunted by unexplained visions. As the visions grow more troublesome and happen more often, she begins to unravel the horrifying circumstances and conspiracy that led to the donor's mysterious death.

Cast and characters

Main
 Sivan Alyra Rose as Sasha Yazzie, a young woman who receives Becky’s heart during a transplant and is haunted by her spirit.
 Marcus LaVoi as Big Frank Yazzie, Sasha’s uncle
 Uma Thurman as Nancy Lefevre, the grieving mother of Becky.
 Tony Goldwyn as Ben Lefevre, the grieving father of Becky.
 Nicholas Galitzine as Elliott Lefevre, the drug addicted twin brother of Becky.
 Kyanna Simone Simpson as Yvonne Perkins, Sasha’s best friend
 Griffin Powell-Arcand as TJ Locklear, Sasha’s boyfriend.
 Sarah Mezzanotte as Marnie, Becky’s best friend and member of Annex.
 Lilli Kay as Penelope Fowler

Recurring
 Lilliya Reid as Becky Lefevre, the deceased daughter of Ben and Nancy.
Lili Taylor as Ruth Pezim, a spiritual adviser who cofounded Annex, a spiritual organization. 
Matthew Rauch as Evan Pezim, Ruth’s husband and cofounder of Annex. 
Jonny Rios as Ravi Jerome, Marnie’s boyfriend and Becky’s ex-lover. 
Michael Stahl-David as Coach Jones, a school councilor and member of Annex. 
Khan Baykal as Deacon, a member of Annex. 
Richard Ray Whitman as Harrison Yazzie, Sasha’s grandfather. 
Patrice Johnson as Tracey Perkins, Yvonne’s mother who suffers from Alzheimer's disease.
Marie Wagenman as young Becky Lefevre, daughter of Ben and Nancy.

Episodes

Production

Development
On January 10, 2018, it was announced that Netflix had given the production a series order for a first season. The series is created by Leah Rachel, who is credited as an executive producer, alongside Stephen Gaghan, Akela Cooper, Jennifer Yale, Wolfgang Hammer, Winnie Kemp and Alfonso Gomez-Rejon. In March 2019, it was confirmed that the series would premiere on April 26, 2019. On June 18, 2019, Netflix cancelled the series after one season.

Casting
In May 2018, it was announced that Uma Thurman was cast in the series. In June 2018, Tony Goldwyn joined the series. In December 2018, Sivan Alyra Rose, Lilliya Reid, Nicholas Galitzine, Kyanna Simone Simpson, Lilli Kay, Sarah Mezzanotte and Griffin Powell-Arcand had been cast in the series.

Filming
Principal photography for the first season began in June 2018 and concluded in November 2018, in Albuquerque.

Premiere
In March 2019, the series held its official premiere with the screening of the first two episodes at the Series Mania International Festival in Lille, France.

Release
On April 10, 2019, the official trailer for the series was released.

Reception
Based on 38 reviews collected by Rotten Tomatoes, 42% of the critics positively reviewed Chambers, with an average rating of 5.79/10. The website's consensus reads, "Promising performances and an intriguing premise can't keep Chambers meandering melodrama from getting lost in its own haunted hallways." Metacritic calculated an average score of 48 out of 100 based on 16 reviews, indicating "mixed or average reviews".

References

External links
 
 

2010s American drama television series
2010s American high school television series
2010s American horror television series
2010s American mystery television series
2010s American supernatural television series
2019 American television series debuts
2019 American television series endings
American thriller television series
Horror drama television series
Television shows filmed in New Mexico
English-language Netflix original programming
Serial drama television series
Thriller television series
Television series about teenagers
Television shows set in Arizona
Demons in television
Native Americans in popular culture
Television shows about Native Americans